Malgah (also Romanized as Malgāh; also known as Malgeh) is a village in Abdan Rural District, in the Central District of Deyr County, Bushehr Province, Iran. At the 2006 census, its population was 123, in 22 families.

References 

Populated places in Deyr County